Falco, also spelled Falko, is an unincorporated community in Covington County, Alabama, United States. The community lies entirely within the Conecuh National Forest.

History
The community's name is an acronym for the Florida-Alabama Land Company, which harvested timber in the area. Falco was founded by members of the Florida-Alabama Land Company in 1903. The community was home to a large sawmill, the Falco Bank, Falco Bottling Company, a 40-room hotel, a grist mill and general stores. A two-story railroad depot sat near the logging railroads, which connected to the Central of Georgia and L&N lines. The town began to decline after a fire destroyed the saw mill in 1925. The mill was then moved to Willow, Florida.  A post office operated under the name Falco from 1903 to 1955.

Falco was photographed by John Collier Jr., who was working for the Farm Security Administration under Roy Stryker.

Demographics
Falco was listed as an incorporated community on the U.S. Census from 1920 to 1940.

Notable person
 Emory Williams, businessman and entrepreneur

References

External links
 1942 photographs of Falco
 Additional photographs of Falco, including railroad pictures

Unincorporated communities in Covington County, Alabama
Unincorporated communities in Alabama